Gergini Reef (‘Rif Gergini’ \'rif ger-'gi-ni\) is the triangular flat and rocky low-tide elevation off the northwest coast of Snow Island in the South Shetland Islands, Antarctica.  It extends 400 m in east–west direction and is 210 m wide. The feature is named after the settlement of Gergini in Northern Bulgaria.

Location
Bulgarian mapping in 2009.

Maps
 L.L. Ivanov. Antarctica: Livingston Island and Greenwich, Robert, Snow and Smith Islands. Scale 1:120000 topographic map.  Troyan: Manfred Wörner Foundation, 2009.
 Antarctic Digital Database (ADD). Scale 1:250000 topographic map of Antarctica. Scientific Committee on Antarctic Research (SCAR). Since 1993, regularly upgraded and updated

References
 Bulgarian Antarctic Gazetteer. Antarctic Place-names Commission. (details in Bulgarian, basic data in English)
 Gergini Reef. SCAR Composite Gazetteer of Antarctica

External links
 Gergini Reef. Copernix satellite image

Islands of the South Shetland Islands
Bulgaria and the Antarctic